Karine Teles (born 16 August 1978) is a Brazilian actress, screenwriter and filmmaker. She is best known for her role in The Second Mother.

Filmography

Film

Television

References

External links
 Karine Teles at IMDb

Brazilian film actresses
Brazilian telenovela actresses
1978 births
Living people